A cruise line is a company that operates cruise ships and markets cruises to the public. Cruise lines are distinct from passenger lines which are primarily concerned with transportation of their passengers. Cruise lines have a dual character; they are partly in the transportation business, and partly in the leisure entertainment business, a duality that carries down into the ships themselves, which have both a crew headed by the ship's captain, and a hospitality staff headed by the equivalent of a hotel manager.

Because of mergers and consolidations, a cruise line may also be a brand of a larger holding corporation. For example, as noted below, Carnival Cruise Line and Holland America Line are cruise lines within the larger parent corporation Carnival Corporation & plc. This industry practice of using the brand, not the larger parent corporation, as the cruise line is also followed in the member cruise lines in Cruise Lines International Association (CLIA); the listing of cruise ship sales, transfers, and new orders; cruise line market share; and the member-based reviews of cruise lines.

Cruise ships can cruise in oceans or rivers. The listing of cruise lines below includes separate lists for both areas. Cruise lines operating ocean and river ships can be found in both lists.

List of cruise lines by size 
 the cruise industry was estimated to be around 23.8 billion with 13.9 million annualised passengers. The following is a list of the largest cruise lines with over 1,000 passengers annually and their market share by passengers and revenue as of 2021 according to Cruise Market Watch. The list also includes the combined market share of each of the cruise line holding companies: Carnival Corporation & plc, Royal Caribbean Group, Norwegian Cruise Line Holdings, TUI Group, and Genting Hong Kong.

Legend:
 Bold: Major cruise company
 Italic: Subsidiary of a major cruise company

List of ocean cruise lines

Operational 
The following is a list of operational ocean cruise lines.

Shipping line still in service 
The following is a list of defunct ocean cruise line with their shipping line is still in service.

Defunct 
The following is a list of defunct ocean cruise line.

List of river cruise lines

Operational
The following is a list of operational river cruise line.

Defunct
The following is a list of defunct river cruise line.

See also

 List of ferry operators
 List of cruise ships
 List of largest cruise ships

References

 
Cruise Lines
cruise lines
Cruise lines